Suzhou International Expo Center, located to the east of Jinji Lake in Suzhou Industrial Park, Suzhou, Jiangsu, is a convention center in China. It occupies an area of 188,600 m2, and its total gross floor area is 255,000 square meters. It is said to have the world's largest uninterrupted exhibition space, according to Xinhua News Agency.

References

External links
Suzhou International Expo Center 

Buildings and structures in Suzhou
Suzhou Industrial Park
Convention and exhibition centers in China
2004 establishments in China
Economy of Suzhou